Francisco José Castro Fernandes (born 18 September 1981), commonly known as Chico, is a Portuguese former footballer who played as a striker.

Club career
Chico was born in Vila Nova de Famalicão, Braga District. In a career mainly associated with F.C. Famalicão, he appeared in 103 Segunda Liga matches and scored 14 goals over five seasons. Professionally, he also competed in Romania.

References

External links

1981 births
Living people
People from Vila Nova de Famalicão
Portuguese footballers
Association football forwards
Liga Portugal 2 players
Segunda Divisão players
F.C. Famalicão players
C.D. Trofense players
Varzim S.C. players
G.D. Chaves players
G.D. Ribeirão players
Liga I players
Liga II players
FCV Farul Constanța players
Portuguese expatriate footballers
Expatriate footballers in Romania
Portuguese expatriate sportspeople in Romania
Sportspeople from Braga District